(combination of the words "big" and "globe") is one of the leading internet service providers in Japan, operated by NEC BIGLOBE, Ltd., a 2006 spin-off from NEC.

KDDI acquired the company in January 2017 for 80 billion yen.

References

Internet service providers of Japan
Former NEC subsidiaries
KDDI
Internet technology companies of Japan